Conus compressus is a species of sea snail, a marine gastropod mollusk in the family Conidae, the cone snails and their allies.

The database WoRMS lists this species only tentatively, as it may be a synonym for a northern form of Conus anemone. As there are conservation implications, a precautionary approach should be taken, and C. compressus is here tentatively listed as a valid species. The real C. compressus has a distribution restricted from Geraldton to Shark Bay, but in recent years the name has been mistakenly applied to a tall-spired form of anemone from South Australia.

Like all cone snail species, these snails are predatory and venomous. They are capable of "stinging" humans, therefore live ones should be handled carefully or not at all.

Description
The size of the shell varies between 25 mm and 67 mm.

Distribution
This marine species occurs off Southern Australia.

References

  Lamarck, J.B.P.A. de M. 1810. Suite des espèces du genre Cône. Annales du Muséum National d'Histoire Naturelle. Paris 15: 263-286, 422-442
 Sowerby, G.B. 1866. Monograph of the genus Conus. pp. 328-329 in Thesaurus Conchyliorum, or monographs of genera of shells. London : Sowerby, G.B. Vol. 3.
 Tomlin, J.R. le B. 1937. Catalogue of Recent and Fossil Cones. Proceedings of the Zoological Society of London 22: 205-333
  Petit, R. E. (2009). George Brettingham Sowerby, I, II & III: their conchological publications and molluscan taxa. Zootaxa. 2189: 1–218
 Puillandre N., Duda T.F., Meyer C., Olivera B.M. & Bouchet P. (2015). One, four or 100 genera? A new classification of the cone snails. Journal of Molluscan Studies. 81: 1-23

External links
 To Biodiversity Heritage Library (1 publication)
 To USNM Invertebrate Zoology Mollusca Collection
 To World Register of Marine Species
 Cone Shells - Knights of the Sea
 

Gastropods of Australia
compressus
Gastropods described in 1866